Hellmuth Walter Kommanditgesellschaft (HWK), Helmuth Walter Werke (HWM), or commonly known as the Walter-Werke, was a German company founded by Professor Hellmuth Walter to pursue his interest in engines using hydrogen peroxide as a fuel.

Having experimented with torpedoes and submarines, Walter began to design rocket engines for aircraft and founded the HWK in Kiel in 1935.

During World War II the HWK developed and built a variety of rocket engines for assisted take-off (RATO), and guided missiles, before developing main propulsion engines for rocket-powered interceptor aircraft, notably the Messerschmitt Me 163 Komet and the Bachem Ba 349 Natter.

HWM designed the steam catapult that launched the V-1 flying bomb.  The steam was generated through the combination of T-Stoff and Z-Stoff.

The company was wound up in 1945 and Walter subsequently continued his work in the United States.

See also 
 C-Stoff – another chemical fuel developed by HWK
 Walter HWK 109-500 – RATO-podded Starthilfe, self-contained booster rocket engine unit
 Walter HWK 109-509 – Germany's primary aircraft rocket engine
 Gotha Go 242 – rocket-assisted glider
 Heinkel He 176 – rocket aircraft
 Henschel Hs 293 - radio-controlled rocket-assisted anti-ship glide-bomb
 DFS 228 – rocket aircraft
 DFS 346 – rocket aircraft
 HMS Meteorite – HTP-powered submarine

References

External links
 http://www.walterwerke.co.uk/walter/index.htm

Defunct aircraft engine manufacturers of Germany
Rocket engine manufacturers of Germany